Åsta is a village in Åmot Municipality in Innlandet county, Norway. The village of Åsta lies at the confluence of the rivers Åsta and Glomma. The Norwegian National Road 3 runs through the village. The Rørosbanen railway line also passes through the village, stopping at Åsta Station.

Åsta was the site of the Åsta accident, which claimed 19 lives.

References 

Åmot
Villages in Innlandet
Populated places on the Glomma River